The Texas Veterans Land Board, also known as VLB, is part of the Texas General Land Office. Created by the Texas Legislature in 1946, the board was established to make land available to veterans returning from World War II.

Today, the organization finances land, home loans and home improvement loans for Texas veterans and active military members who are eligible under VLB requirements.

The board is composed of a chairman, who is the commissioner of the GLO (currently Commissioner George P. Bush), plus two citizens — one specializing in veterans' affairs and one in finances. The citizen members are appointed by the Governor of Texas.

VLB also owns and manages four Texas State Veterans Cemeteries and the Texas State Veterans Home Program. The veterans home program provides skilled long-term care to veterans and their spouses in eight veterans homes across Texas.

History

In 1954, a newspaper reporter discovered that many veterans, in exchange for money, were tricked into signing loans to purchase land in several South Texas counties. Subsequent investigation of the General Land Office resulted in a major scandal. Texas Land Commissioner Bascom Giles went to prison for conspiracy to commit theft, becoming the first Texas state official to go to prison for a crime committed in office.

Land loan program

The basic requirements for an applicant to participate in the Veterans Land Program are as follows:
 At least 18 years of age
 A bona fide and legal resident of Texas on the date of application and meet one of the following service criteria:
 An active duty military member
 A member of the Texas National Guard
 A reserve component military member having completed 20 qualifying years for retirement
 Served at least 90 days of active duty days unless discharged sooner due to service-connected disability and not discharged dishonorably
 A surviving spouse of a Veteran listed as missing in action or whose death was service-connected

A minimum 5% down payment is required in addition to application and appraisal fees. The interest rate for land loans as of February 2017 is 7.25%.

Disabled veterans and surviving spouses may qualify for additional interest rate deductions for housing and home improvement loans.

Other programs
In 1983, the Texas Veterans Housing Assistance Program was created to offer up to $417,000 in home loan financing to Texas veterans.

In 1986, the Texas Veterans Home Improvement Program was introduced to offer Texas veterans up to $50,000 in home improvement loans. Interest rates for VLB housing and home improvement loans are posted online weekly.

Disabled veterans and surviving spouses may qualify for additional interest rate deductions for veteran home loans and home improvement loans.

The Texas Voices of Veterans Oral History Program was begun in 2008 as a means of recording and saving veterans interviews for posterity.

References

External links
Texas Veterans Land Board official site

Agriculture
Veterans' affairs in the United States
State departments of veterans affairs in the United States
Organizations based in Austin, Texas
1946 establishments in Texas
Government agencies established in 1946
Veterans' settlement schemes